Bruno Martignoni (born 13 December 1992) is a Swiss professional footballer. He plays for Locarno.

Club career
Martignoni is from the Italian speaking Canton Ticino. He began his early career with local clubs US Gambarogno and ASC Gordola before moving on to FC Locarno in 2007. After a couple of years in the club's youth teams, he made a breakthrough into the first team in the latter part of 2009. Having featured sparingly, Martignoni went on loan for the 2010–2011 season to Italian club Cagliari Calcio, playing for the reserve team. Returning to Locarno at the end of the season, Martignoni has since established himself as a first choice defender in the team.

International career
Martignoni was a Switzerland youth international. In 2009, he was part of the Swiss under-17 team that won the 2009 FIFA U-17 World Cup beating host nation Nigeria 1—0 in the final. Martignoni played in 6 of the 7 matches at the tournament and scored in the team's semi-final win against Colombia.

Honours
FIFA U-17 World Cup: 2009

References

External links
 
 

1992 births
Living people
Swiss men's footballers
Association football defenders
FC Locarno players
FC Aarau players
FC Lugano players
Servette FC players
FC Chiasso players
AC Bellinzona players
Swiss 1. Liga (football) players
Swiss Challenge League players
Swiss Super League players
2. Liga Interregional players
Swiss Promotion League players